Konstantinos Skoupras (born 16 April 1988) is a Greek professional footballer who plays as a right back.

Club career 
Skoupras started playing as an amateur in Niki Tyrnavou and then signed for Tyrnavos in 2009. After a year playing with the team's youth squad, he was promoted to the first team on 23 August 2010, having signed a five-year contract. He made 48 appearances in two seasons in the Greek Football League 2 (third national division).On 17 of July 2012 he signed a four-year contract with AEL.

External links 
AEL 1964 FC Official
Player Announcement
EPAE profile

1988 births
Living people
Greek footballers
Athlitiki Enosi Larissa F.C. players
Association football fullbacks
Footballers from Larissa